Ted Kurdyla is an American film, television and stage producer.

Kurdyla attended Mater Dei High School.

Career highlights

1980s
Kurdyla began his film career as the location manager for the Brian De Palma film Blow Out, starring John Travolta. The following year, he served as assistant unit production manager on Fighting Back, which starred Tom Skerritt.

In 1984, Kurdyla worked as the production liaison for the New York unit of Once Upon a Time in America, which was directed by Sergio Leone and starred Robert De Niro.

In 1985, Kurdyla served as assistant unit production manager on the Michael Cimino film Year of the Dragon, starring Mickey Rourke. The following year, he was production manager on the Robert Downey Sr. film America. In 1987 he was unit manager on *batteries not included, starring Hume Cronyn and Jessica Tandy.

In 1988, Kurdyla was the production manager on the documentary Imagine: John Lennon, assistant unit production manager for Bright Lights, Big City, starring Michael J. Fox, and unit production manager for the Bud Yorkin comedy Arthur 2: On the Rocks, which starred Dudley Moore and Liza Minnelli.

Kurdyla was the associate producer of the Walter Hill crime drama Johnny Handsome in 1989, starring Mickey Rourke, and ended the decade with the Chevy Chase comedy Fletch Lives, on which he served as production manager.

1990s
In 1990, Kurdyla was the production manager for the Robin Williams/Tim Robbins comedy Cadillac Man.  In 1992 he was the unit production manager for Final Analysis, which starred Richard Gere and Kim Basinger.

In 1993, Kurdyla began producing television programs, serving that year as producer for Trouble Shooters: Trapped Beneath the Earth, starring Kris Kristofferson, then as co-producer for The Cosby Mysteries in 1994.

Also in 1994, Kurdyla produced the television sequel to Alfred Hitchcock's The Birds, titled The Birds II: Land's End, featuring the star of the original film, Tippi Hedren. In 1996 he produced another television thriller, Twilight Man, which starred Tim Matheson.

Toward the close of the decade, Kurdyla returned to theatrical cinema and served as executive producer for Fallen, starring Denzel Washington (1998), and, in 1999, was co-executive producer of The Confession, starring Ben Kingsley and Alec Baldwin.

2000 to present
The new decade saw Kurdyla continuing his role as executive producer of both film and television, beginning with the war drama Tigerland, directed by Joel Schumacher, and then the Bette Midler/Nathan Lane comedy Isn't She Great, both in 2000.

In 2002, Kurdyla collaborated again with Joel Schumacher, serving as executive producer for Schumacher's Phone Booth, starring Colin Farrell.

From 2003–2005, Kurdyla produced two television mini-series for the USA Network: Helen of Troy (2003) and Spartacus (2004).  In 2005, Kurdyla produced and directed World S.U.M.O. Challenge: Battle of the Giants for the ESPN network.

In 2010, Kurdyla entered the world of theater, teaming up with writer/director Charles Messina and serving as executive producer for the staged reading of the Vincent Gogliormella/Messina comedy  'Twas the Night Before a Brooklyn Christmas, which starred Mario Cantone and which was also directed by Messina.

Later that year, Kurdyla executive produced a staged reading of the Messina penned and directed comedy A Room of My Own, starring Ralph Macchio, Cantone, and Gina Ferranti.

In 2012, a play about the life of singer Dion DiMucci, in collaboration with the singer himself, is scheduled to debut in New York City, with Kurdyla serving as executive producer and with Messina signed on as writer and director.

Teaching career
In the 1970s and 'early 80s, Kurdyla taught in the Matawan-Aberdeen Regional School District, where he directed the district's performing arts program. He took a five-month leave  in 1981, in the wake of a suit against the school board, which denied him an administrator position. He did not return to teaching when the leave was up. He also had taught in the district's Lloyd Road Middle School.

List of credits

References

External links 
 Ted Kurdyla on Internet Movie Database (IMDb)

American film producers
Living people
Mater Dei High School (New Jersey) alumni
American television producers
Year of birth missing (living people)